Diwan Bahadur E.K Krishnan (1841–1907) Thalassery in Kannur, served as a sub-judge in the Madras Court in 1861 and as an English writer in the Thalassery Civil Court and munsiple chair.  In 1896 he retired from the British administration with the service of Deputy Collector of Malabar and Diwan of Malabar. EK Krishnan was the son of Kunkan Vaidyar and Devi Kuruvai of Kakkat House, Thalassery, under the Madras Presidency.  Children Janaki Ammal, dewan of Pudukottai E.k Govindan. During the reign of K. Krishnan, Madras was ruled by the Presidency.

Biography
EK Krishnan was the son of Kunkan Vaidyar and Devi Kuruvai of Kakkat family belonged a famous Thiyya House, Thalassery, under the Madras Presidency. And Janaki Ammal, During the reign of K. Krishnan during the reign of the Madras Presidency, Krishnan played a major role in helping many Malayalees to get jobs under the British rule, most of them from Thalassery.

References 

1841 births
1907 deaths
Dewan Bahadurs
People from Thalassery
Civil Servants from Kerala